Len Matela (born January 27, 1980) is a retired American professional basketball player. He played the center position.

Career
Matela played college basketball at Bowling Green State University. He went undrafted in the 2002 NBA draft.

He arrived in Europe in 2002 signing with Mitteldeutscher BC of Germany. He later played his whole career in Belgium with Antwerp Giants, Spirou Charleroi and Liege Basket.

While playing for Antwerp Giants, he was named MVP of the Belgian League in the 2006–07 season.

References

External links
Eurobasket.com Profile

1980 births
Living people
American expatriate basketball people in Belgium
American expatriate basketball people in Germany
American men's basketball players
Antwerp Giants players
Basketball players from Indiana
Bowling Green Falcons men's basketball players
Liège Basket players
Mitteldeutscher BC players
People from Merrillville, Indiana
Spirou Charleroi players
Centers (basketball)